Kate Elizabeth Robbins (born 21 August 1958) is an English actress, singer and songwriter. She came to prominence in the early 1980s when she scored a top ten single on the UK Official Charts with "More Than in Love", while she was appearing in the television soap opera Crossroads. She went on to become a prolific voice actress, most notably for nine years with the satirical show Spitting Image.

Early life
Robbins is the older sister of fellow actress Amy Robbins, sculptor Jane Robbins, and The Sheilas singer Emma Robbins. Her older brother is radio broadcaster and actor Ted Robbins. Through her sister Emma she was the sister-in-law of Simon Shelton and through her sister Amy she is the sister-in-law of actor Robert Daws.

Her father was Mike Robbins, who grew up in Hightown, Wrexham, the son of Ted, who served as the secretary of the Football Association of Wales for more than 35 years.

She attended Wirral Grammar School for Girls in Bebington, Cheshire.

Robbins is a first cousin once removed of Paul McCartney as her mother Elizabeth "Bett" Robbins (née Danher) was McCartney's cousin. In 1960, McCartney and John Lennon performed as "The Nerk Twins" at the Fox and Hounds pub in Caversham, Reading, which was run by Bett and her husband Mike.

Career
Robbins' first released recording, in 1978, was the song Tomorrow, from the musical Annie.  Robbins' first chart appearance was as a backing singer, along with her sister Jane, on the minor Top 40 hit "Lines" by Liverpool group Planets, a spin-off from Deaf School.

Her profile was raised soon afterwards when both she and Jane represented the United Kingdom in the Eurovision Song Contest 1980 as part of the group Prima Donna. They finished third.

The following year, Robbins joined the cast of the ITV soap opera Crossroads, playing the part of a pop singer who was recording a single in the fictional motel's basement recording studio.  The song, "More Than in Love", was released commercially in the UK, credited as Kate Robbins and Beyond and gave Robbins a major hit single, reaching number 2 in the UK Singles Chart. It was her only lead-vocal hit.

In late 1982, Robbins provided backing vocals on the Top 3 single Story of the Blues by Wah!, but was replaced for the band's Top of the Pops appearance by London soul trio Sylvia and the Sapphires.

Robbins wrote the first theme tune to Surprise, Surprise performed by Cilla Black.

She provided almost all the female voices on the television show Spitting Image in the late 1980s and early 1990s. She sang the lead vocals on "The Chicken Song" with Michael Fenton Stevens which reached number 1 in 1986.

The 1986 Granada Television sketch show Robbins featured Kate, her brother Ted Robbins, and her sisters Amy Robbins, Jane Robbins and Emma Robbins. Emma is now best known as one of the singers with The Sheilas.

She participated in the 1989 Children's Royal Variety Performance BBC, singing her own comic songs at the piano, and featured in the original series of Dead Ringers on BBC Radio 4 in 2000.

In 1995, Robbins provided all of the voices, including the male ones, in the children's television series The Caribou Kitchen.

During the 1990s, Robbins performed a number of different roles as both an impersonator and a singer in the BBC Radio 4 satirical comedy series A Look Back at the Nineties and its sequel series A Look Back at the Future.

Robbins also provided the English language dubbing for Europeans, featured on the Channel 4 series Eurotrash and, in 2006, made two appearances on the BBC Radio 4 programme Just a Minute.

In 2007, Robbins was awarded an Honorary Bachelor of Arts degree from Bedfordshire University, for her lifetime contribution to the Performing Arts.

In December 2010, Robbins released her third album, a jazz based affair, entitled Soho Nights, which was written as a collaboration with the Italian saxophonist Alessandro Tomei, and recorded at Abbey Road Studios in London.

Robbins also co-wrote the well-received easy listening album We're Just Passing Through with broadcaster and journalist Nicky Campbell, which was released in 2014.

Robbins was one of the Grumpy Old Women on a sell-out tour in 2014 with comedian Jenny Eclair and actress Susie Blake which toured again in 2015.

Film and television work
Robbins has acted in many feature films.

She was named Best Supporting Actress at the Angel Awards of the Monaco International Film Festival, for her role as Kathleen in the low-budget British film, Fated.

In 2005, she played Joan alongside Johnny Vegas in Sex Lives of the Potato Men.

The following year she appeared with James Franco and Jean Reno in the film Flyboys, playing the role of Clarisse, a brothel Madame.

In the comedy Lunchbox she starred as man-hungry teacher, Suzanne.

She also starred in Farrena Films' comedy-thriller short movie The Other Side With Valerie Hope.

Robbins appeared in two series of the comedy series Dinnerladies, playing the character Babs, a friend of Petula Gordeno, played by Julie Walters, BBC.

Robbins later appeared with the sitcom's writer Victoria Wood in the Christmas special Victoria Wood with All the Trimmings and Victoria Wood's Big Fat Documentary.

Alongside daughter Emily Atack, Robbins appeared on Celebrity Gogglebox and is a regular contributor on Steph's Packed Lunch for Channel 4.

Robbins has worked on many comedy and drama TV shows including:

Last of the Summer Wine (BBC), 
Heartbeat (BBC), 
The Harry Enfield Show (BBC), 
Peter Kay's Phoenix Nights (BBC), 
Shooting Stars (BBC), 
Holby City (BBC), 
Where the Heart Is (BBC - 2 seasons), 
Doctors (BBC), 
Heartbeat (BBC), 
Casualty (BBC), 
Holby City (BBC), 
Citizen Khan (BBC), 
The Legend of Dick and Dom (BBC), 
Soapington Way (written by Harry Hill), 
EastEnders (BBC - character of Jen Glover 2021), 
Mandy (BBC - character of Joan McDonald), 
After Life (Netflix - character of Penny Spencer-Wright, Season 3)

Robbins can also be heard as a voice-over artist on many commercials.

She was the Edith Piaf soundalike on a lager advert. 
She was the 'Doris Day' voice in a Waitrose commercial. 
Her singing can be heard on television advertisements for Clover, Debenhams, First Choice Holidays and many more. She also recorded the Capital Radio jingle package for Sue Manning Productions.

She also played The Singing Ring in the mini-series The 10th Kingdom, which aired in 2000.

Filmography

Theatre Credits

Radio

Personal life

Robbins divorced musician Keith Atack in 2007 after 19 years of marriage. The couple had three children: actress Emily Atack (born 1989); Martha Atack (born 1991), a PR consultant; and George Atack (born 1992), a musician and TV researcher.

UK discography

Singles
1978 "Tomorrow" (Anchor)
1980 "Love Enough for Two" (Ariola) (with Prima Donna) UK No. 48
1980 "Just Got to be You" (Ariola) (with Prima Donna)
1981 "More Than in Love (RCA) UK No. 2
1981 "I Want You Back" (RCA)
1981 "Run Wild" (RCA)
1983 "The Real Me" (RCA)
1983 "That First Love"
1986 "The Chicken Song" (Lead female vocal) 
1988 "If You Wanna Help Somebody"

Albums
1981 Kate Robbins (RCA)
2008 Songs from the Pool
2010 Soho Nights
2014 We're Just Passing Through (Long Lunch Music)

Voices
 The Beano Video - Neighbour's Wife
 The Beano Videostars - Nurse

References

External links

English impressionists (entertainers)
Living people
Actresses from Liverpool
Musicians from Liverpool
English television actresses
English film actresses
English people of Welsh descent
Eurovision Song Contest entrants for the United Kingdom
Eurovision Song Contest entrants of 1980
Comedians from Liverpool
1958 births